The 1891 Tennessee Volunteers football team represented the University of Tennessee in the 1891 season.  This was the first Tennessee Volunteers football team.  They traveled on Thanksgiving Day to Chattanooga, Tennessee to face Sewanee. They had no head coach and were mainly an intramural team.

Schedule

References

Tennessee
Tennessee Volunteers football seasons
College football winless seasons
Tennessee Volunteers football